The Randwick City Stakes is an AJC Listed Australian Thoroughbred open quality handicap horse race for horses three years old and older, over a distance of 2000 metres. It is held annually at Randwick Racecourse in Sydney in March. Total prize money for the race is A$160,000.

History
 Prior to 2006 the race was known as the Canterbury Cup and run at Canterbury Park Racecourse.

The winners

       2022 -   Zeyrek
       2021 -   Mount Popa
       2020 -   Shared Ambition
       2019 -   Hiyaam
       2018 -   Emperors Way
       2017 -   Astronomos
       2016 -   Libran
       2015 -   Phrases
       2014 -   Junoob
       2013 -   Tremec
       2012 -   Maules Creek
	2011 -	Saint Encosta
	2010 -	The Embassy
	2009 -	Newport
	2008 -	No Wine No Song
	2007 -	Spirit Of Tara
	2006 -	Dizelle
	2005 -	Winning Belle
	2004 -	Zabarra
	2003 -	Bedouin
	2002 -	Kaapgun
	2001 -	Steel Phoenix
	2000 -	Edward Brae
	1999 -	Red Ivory
	1998 -	Waikikamukau
	1997 -	Hula Flight
	1996 -	Electronic
	1995 -	Sovereign Kite
	1994 -	Air Seattle
	1993 -	Naturalism
	1992 -	Just Tommy
	1991 -	Estimable
	1990 -	Yarra Bay
	1989 -	Noble Clubs
	1988 -	Cosmic Kingdom
	1987 -	Commercial Balance
	1986 -	Nimble Touch
	1985 -	Late Show
	1984 -	Lord Paddington
	1983 -	Lost Valley
	1982 -	Bianco Lady
	1981 -	Vivacite
	1980 -	Pigalle
	1979 -	Happy Union
	1978 -	Ready O'ready
	1977 -	Ready O'ready
	1976 -	Future Shock
	1975 -	Gay Bonnie
	1974 -	French Cavalier
	1973 -	Analie
	1972 -	True Pal
	1971 -	Paris Girl
	1970 -	Royal Parma
	1969 -	Oromedes
	1968 -	Prince Judea
	1967 -	Brigade
	1966 -	Versailles
	1965 -	Rakaia
	1964 -	Royal Emblem
	1963 -	Kamikaze
	1962 -	Nidebra
	1961 -	Johnno
	1960 -	Dare Say
	1959 -	Half Hennessy
	1958 -	Waterford
	1957 -	Evening Peal
	1956 -	Compound
	1955 -	Shadford
	1954 -	Royal Stream
	1953 -	Great World
	1952 -	All Jeep
	1951 -	Bankstream
	1950 -	Chitral
	1949 -	Silent
	1948 -	Wellington
	1947 -	Air Flare

See also
 List of Australian Group races
 Group races

References

 Australian Studbook - AJC Randwick City Stakes Race Winners
 

Horse races in Australia